The WWE Raw Tag Team Championship is a professional wrestling world tag team championship created and promoted by the American promotion WWE, defended on the Raw brand division. It is one of two male tag team championships for WWE's main roster, along with the WWE SmackDown Tag Team Championship on SmackDown. The current champions are The Usos (Jey Uso and Jimmy Uso), who are in their third reign. The Usos concurrently hold the SmackDown Tag Team Championship and are recognized as the Undisputed WWE Tag Team Champions.

The championship was originally established as the WWE Tag Team Championship on October 3, 2002, and the team of Kurt Angle and Chris Benoit were the inaugural champions. It was introduced for the SmackDown brand as a second title for tag teams in the promotion to complement WWE's original World Tag Team Championship, which became exclusive to Raw. Both titles were unified in 2009 and were collectively referred to as the "Unified WWE Tag Team Championship" while officially remaining independently active until the World Tag Team Championship was formally decommissioned in 2010. As a result of the 2016 WWE Draft, the championship became exclusive to Raw with a subsequent rename, with SmackDown then creating their own counterpart title.

History 

From 1971 until 2002, the World Tag Team Championship was the primary men's world tag team championship of the professional wrestling promotion WWE. Following The Invasion storyline, WWE's roster doubled in size due to the influx of wrestlers from the former promotions, World Championship Wrestling and Extreme Championship Wrestling. As a result, WWE introduced the brand extension in March 2002 to divide its roster between the Raw and SmackDown! brands where wrestlers would exclusively perform on their respective weekly television programs. The World Tag Team Championship initially became exclusive to SmackDown!, but was later reassigned to Raw, leaving the former without a tag team title. As a result, SmackDown! General Manager Stephanie McMahon introduced the WWE Tag Team Championship and commissioned it to be the tag team title for the SmackDown! brand on October 3, 2002. She also announced that the inaugural champions would be determined from an eight-team tournament. At No Mercy on October 20, 2002, the team of Kurt Angle and Chris Benoit defeated Rey Mysterio and Edge in the tournament final to become the inaugural WWE Tag Team Champions.

On October 17, 2007, SmackDown! and ECW (which became a third brand in 2006) announced a talent sharing agreement that enabled talent from either brand's roster to compete on both brands. As a result, the title became eligible to be contended and defended on both brands. In late 2008 through early 2009, reigning WWE Tag Team Champions The Colóns (Carlito and Primo) engaged in rivalry with reigning World Tag Team Champions John Morrison and The Miz, which resulted in the announcement on the March 17 episode of ECW that at WrestleMania 25, both teams would defend their titles against each other and the winning team would hold both titles. The Colóns defeated Morrison and Miz, and thus unified the titles into what became known as the Unified WWE Tag Team Championship, the umbrella term for what officially remained two active championships that were now collectively defended. The championships would be defended as the Unified WWE Tag Team Championship on any brand until August 2010. That month, the Anonymous Raw General Manager announced that the World Tag Team Championship would be decommissioned in favor of continuing the WWE Tag Team Championship, which received a new, single set of championship belts, which were presented to reigning champions The Hart Dynasty (Tyson Kidd and David Hart Smith) by Bret Hart. The WWE Tag Team Championship, which dropped the "unified" moniker, subsequently became the sole tag team championship in WWE, available to any brand. The first brand extension then ended in August 2011.

Following the reintroduction of the brand extension in July 2016, reigning champions The New Day (Big E, Kofi Kingston, and Xavier Woods) were drafted to the Raw brand, making the championship exclusive to Raw. In response, SmackDown created the SmackDown Tag Team Championship on August 23, 2016. The WWE Tag Team Championship was subsequently renamed to Raw Tag Team Championship and The New Day were the first champions to hold the title under its new name. In 2019, WWE's developmental territory NXT became the promotion's third major brand when it was moved to the USA Network in September, thus making the NXT Tag Team Championship the third major tag team title for men in WWE. However, this recognition was reversed when NXT reverted to its original function as a developmental brand in September 2021.

At WrestleMania 34 on April 8, 2018, reigning Raw Tag Team Champions Cesaro and Sheamus were scheduled to defend the title against Braun Strowman and a partner of his choosing. At the event, Strowman revealed that his partner would be a fan from the live audience. He then went out into the crowd and picked 10-year old Nicholas, and the two defeated Cesaro and Sheamus for the title. This made Nicholas the youngest WWE champion in history. Nicholas was also revealed to be the son of WWE referee, John Cone. The following night on Raw, the two relinquished the titles.

During the May 20, 2022, episode of SmackDown, reigning SmackDown Tag Team Champions The Usos (Jey Uso and Jimmy Uso) defeated reigning Raw Tag Team Champions RK-Bro (Randy Orton and Riddle) in a Winners Take All match to claim both championships and become recognized as the Undisputed WWE Tag Team Champions. WWE had billed the match as a championship unification match; however, both titles remain independently active with The Usos being double champions. They defended both titles together across both brands as the Undisputed WWE Tag Team Championship, but began defending the titles separately in January 2023.

Inaugural WWE Tag Team Championship Tournament (2002)
The WWE Tag Team Championship Tournament was a tournament held  to crown the inaugural WWE Tag Team Champions for the SmackDown brand. It concluded at No Mercy on October 20, 2002, and was won by the team of Kurt Angle and Chris Benoit.

Brand designation history 
Following the events of the WWE brand extension, an annual WWE draft was established, in which select members of WWE's roster are reassigned to a different brand. After the WWE Tag Team Championship was unified with the World Tag Team Championship as the Unified WWE Tag Team Championship, the champions could appear and defend the titles on any WWE brand. The titles were combined as the WWE Tag Team Championship in August 2010 with a single set of belts, and continued to be defended on any brand. The brand extension was discontinued on August 29, 2011, but it was revived on July 19, 2016. The following is a list of dates indicating the transitions of the WWE (Raw) Tag Team Championship between the Raw, SmackDown, and ECW brands.

Belt design

In August 2010, the WWE Tag Team Championship received a redesign. Taking inspiration from Greece, the belts feature a center plate dominated by two Spartan helmets facing outward and the center plate is encircled with a meander pattern. At the top of the center plate is the WWE logo and at the bottom is a banner that reads "Tag Team" on one line and "Champions" below that. On both sides of the center plate are two side plates. The inner side plates feature the WWE logo and are encircled with the meander pattern, while the outer side plates feature a single Spartan helmet facing inward. When this belt design was introduced in 2010, the plates were bronze colored and featured the long-standing WWE scratch logo and the straps were black. In August 2014, the belts, along with all other pre-existing championship belts in WWE at the time, received a minor update, replacing the scratch logo with WWE's current logo that was originally used for the WWE Network. 

In August 2016, after the reintroduction of the brand split and the creation of the SmackDown Tag Team Championship, the WWE Tag Team Championship was renamed to Raw Tag Team Championship. The belts received an update on December 19 that year to reflect the name change. Featuring the same physical design, the plates were made silver and the straps changed to red, countering the silver plates on blue straps design of the SmackDown Tag Team Championship belts. While all other WWE championship belts have been updated to feature customizable side plates for the champion's logos, the Raw and SmackDown tag titles are the only championship belts in the promotion that lack this feature.

Reigns

The team of Cesaro and Sheamus and The New Day (Kofi Kingston and Xavier Woods) have the most reigns as a team at four, while individually, Kingston and Seth Rollins have the most with six. The New Day's second reign is also the longest reign at 483 days and they are the only team to hold the championship for over one consecutive year—Big E is also credited for this reign as during New Day's first two reigns, Big E, Kingston, and Woods were all recognized as champion under the Freebird Rule (Big E was split from the team in the 2020 WWE Draft). John Cena and The Miz's sole reign is the shortest reign at 9 minutes, due to The Corre invoking their rematch clause immediately after losing the title. As a team, The New Day (across its two different variants of team members) also have the longest combined reign at 627 days, while Kingston individually has the longest combined reign at 912 days (910 days as recognized by WWE). Nicholas is the youngest champion at 10 years old (also making him the youngest champion in WWE history), while Billy Gunn is the oldest champion at age 50.

The Usos (Jey Uso and Jimmy Uso) are the current champions in their third reign. They defeated RK-Bro (Randy Orton and Riddle) in a Winners Take All match on the May 20, 2022, episode of SmackDown in Grand Rapids, Michigan. The Usos had also defended the SmackDown Tag Team Championship in the match, and with both titles, they are recognized as the Undisputed WWE Tag Team Champions.

See also
 Tag team championships in WWE

Notes

References 
 General
 
 
 Specific

External links 
 Official Raw Tag Team Title History

WWE Raw
WWE tag team championships